The Beat This Summer Tour was the eighth headlining tour from American Country music singer Brad Paisley. The tour was in support of his ninth studio album, Wheelhouse (2013) and was presented by Cracker Barrel. Paisley's tour began on May 9, 2013, in Maryland Heights, Missouri and will end on March 16, 2014, in London, England.

Background
The tour was first announced on February 27, 2013. Paisley teamed up with Live Beyond and one dollar from every ticket sale went to the nonprofit organization. In November 2013 additional U.S. dates were announced for early 2014. This leg of the tour is called the Beat This Winter Tour.

Opening acts
Chris Young
Danielle Bradbery
Lee Brice 
The Henningsens

Setlist
This setlist is a representation of the Raleigh, NC show on June 8, 2013.
"Southern Comfort Zone"
"Mud on the Tires"
"The Mona Lisa"
"American Saturday Night"
"Outstanding in Our Field" 
"This Is Country Music"
"Celebrity"
"Then"
"She's Everything"
"Time Warp"
"Hot for Teacher" 
"Old Alabama" 
"If You're Gonna Play in Texas (You Gotta Have a Fiddle in the Band)" 
"Waitin' on a Woman"
"Online"
"I'm Still a Guy"
"Beat This Summer"
"I'm Gonna Miss Her (The Fishin' Song)"
"Karate" 
"Remind Me" 
"Welcome to the Future"
"Water"
Encore
"Ticks"
"Alcohol"

Tour dates

Festivals
 This concert is a part of 92.5 WXTU FM's 29th Anniversary Show.
This concert is a part of Country Thunder.
This concert is a part of the Rockin' River Festival.
This concert is a part of the Willamette Country Music Festival.
This concert is a part of Country 2 Country.

Box office score data

Personnel
Gary Hooker: Rhythm guitar
Randle Currie: Steel guitar
Kendall Marcy: Keyboards, banjo, and mandolin 
Justin Williamson: Fiddle & mandolin
Kenny Lewis: Bass guitar
Ben Sesar: Drums

References

External links
 

2013 concert tours
2014 concert tours
Brad Paisley concert tours